Twins (AVEP) was the first EP for Twins and was released in August 2001. It contained 3 music videos and 6 songs. Among the songs, Ming Ai An Lian Bu Xi She (明愛暗戀補習社) was popular.

Release, promotion and marketing 
In an effort to promote the EP to a younger audience, Emperor Entertainment Group bundled the EP with bonus items and coupons, such as hair care products and vouchers for gifts of sushi.

The initial EP release was a success, selling 10,000 copies in under 24 hours.

Tracklist

Computer Data Not Playable   
"明愛暗戀補習社 [Opening Love & Secret Love in Tutoring Class]" (Music Video)   
"女校男生 [Male Student in Girls' School]" (Music Video)   
"明愛暗戀補習社 [Opening Love & Secret Love in Tutoring Class]" (Music Video 拍攝花絮 [Behind The Scenes])   
"快熟時代 [Fast Maturing Era]"
"明愛暗戀補習社 [Opening Love & Secret Love in Tutoring Class]" (Assembly Mix)
"女校男生 [Male Student in Girls' School]"      
"換季 [Changing Seasons]"
"盲頭烏蠅 (Blind-headed Fly)"
"明愛暗戀補習社 [Opening Love & Secret Love in Tutoring Class]" (After School Mix)

References

2001 EPs
Twins (group) EPs